Lesotho is a Southern African nation surrounded entirely by South Africa. The largest ethnic group is the Basotho. The Basotho culture is immersed in musical traditions.

National anthem
The national anthem of Lesotho is "Lesotho Fatse La Bontata Rona".  Written by François Coillard, a French missionary, it appears in the popular computer game "Sims 2: University" as the theme from a videogame console.

Traditional instruments

Traditional musical instruments include lekolulo, a kind of flute played by herding boys, setolo-tolo, resembling an extended jaw harp played by men using their mouth, and the women's stringed thomo. More recently the mamokhorong, sometimes known as the sekhankula, has also become popular.

Church music
Vocal choirs, which sing church music in Sesotho, are extremely popular. These choirs are formed in 
villages, towns, churches, etc., and can be heard on the radio every evening.

Popular music
As an enclave of South Africa, it is not surprising that South African musicians have a large following in Lesotho. Most frequently heard on the radio are various sub-Saharan AfroPop styles, Sotho Hip-hop, RnB, Deep house, Soulful House, Dancehall, Jazz, kwaito, and reggae.

While South African music is generally enjoyed in Lesotho, there is a tremendous following for famo (contemporary Sesotho music, which features the accordion and oil can drum) such as that by Mosotho Chakela. The music recording industry is nascent, but many of the Basotho musicians sign with South African companies - undermining growth prospects. Malome Vector, Ntate Stunna, Taiylor Manson and Juvy are well known musicians in the South African music Industry. Malome Vector is signed under a well known recoding label 'Ambitioz Entertainment'.

Music festival
The Morija Arts & Cultural Festival is a prominent Sotho music festival, held annually, which highlights the dance and music of the Basotho people.

Famous BaSotho musicians
 Joshua Pulumo Mohapeloa

See also
Morija Arts & Cultural Festival
Lesotho Culture

References

External links
Morija Arts & Cultural Festival
Recordings of music from Lesotho recorded by Kevin Volans